Alex W. Joske is a Chinese-Australian author, sinologist, open-source intelligence researcher, and risk consultant who investigates the Chinese Communist Party (CCP), particularly its influence operations. Previously a researcher with the Australian Strategic Policy Institute, his writing has appeared in The New York Times, The Washington Post, and NBC News, and he has spoken at research institutions including the Center for Strategic and International Studies and the Hoover Institution. His first major work influenced legislation in the United States Congress to ban People's Liberation Army (PLA) officials from sensitive U.S. government laboratories. He was publicly banned from entering China by the Chinese government in 2020 due to his work.

Early life and career 
Alex Joske grew up in Beijing as a teenager, and is fluent in Mandarin Chinese. He attended the Australian National University, graduating in 2018 with a Bachelor of Arts in Chinese language. In September 2016, Joske and fellow student, cyber-dissident and Chinese expat Wu Lebao, attended an ANU gala organized by Chinese students. After being reportedly cornered and trailed to a bathroom by organizers from the Chinese Students and Scholars Association, Lebao and Joske published a 2017 exposé in Woroni about the association and their experiences with its members at the gala. Later in his university studies, he spent a year at National Taiwan Normal University studying Chinese. After graduation he spent a year working at Charles Stuart University as a researcher for Clive Hamilton for his book, Silent Invasion: China's Influence in Australia. Both Joske and Hamilton were later banned from China in the same press release from Chinese state-run news.

In 2018, Joske joined the Australian Strategic Policy Institute (ASPI) as its youngest ever researcher, working on China-related analysis for the next four years. At ASPI, he wrote prolifically on the CCP's united front work, the People's Liberation Army (PLA), and the Ministry of State Security (MSS). His first ASPI report "Picking flowers, making honey", on the PLA's use of research collaboration with foreign universities to advance its technology transfer efforts and weapons research, catalyzed legislation in the United States Congress to ban Chinese military researchers from U.S. government-funded laboratories.

In September 2020, Joske was banned from entering China. The Global Times, a state-owned national newspaper, announced his ban – alongside that of Clive Hamilton – without explanation. In a public response, Joske described the ban as "the latest attempt by the Chinese Communist Party to… …punish those who shine a light on its activities", noting that the accuracy of his research had never been challenged by the Chinese government.

In May 2022, he joined Australian corporate risk advisory firm, McGrathNicol, as a senior risk advisor.

In October 2022, Joske released his first book, Spies and Lies, detailing Chinese espionage practices, particularly Chinese intelligence activity abroad. The book attracted attention for its exploration of the MSS' successful cooption of Australian prime minister Bob Hawke to rehabilitate China's image following the 1989 Tiananmen Square protests and massacre. The book was released to favorable reviews in Foreign Affairs, The Wall Street Journal, and The Economist.

Selected works

See also 

 Wu Lebao

References 

Australian academics
Australian National University alumni
Australian people of Chinese descent
Living people
Chinese people of Australian descent
People from Beijing
Year of birth missing (living people)